Liu Huan (born August 26, 1963, in Tianjin) is a Chinese singer and songwriter. He is one of China's modern era pioneers in pop music. He combines his music career with teaching the history of Western music at the Beijing University of International Business and Economics in Beijing.

Early life
On August 26, 1963, Liu Huan was born into a family of teachers in Tianjin. Liu graduated from Yaohua High School in Tianjin in 1981. Four years later, he graduated from the University of International Relations in Beijing, majoring in French literature. During his university days, he participated in a French songwriting competition and won first prize, as well as sponsorship from the French government to go on a tour to Paris. Following that, Liu was sent to the Ningxia Hui Autonomous Region in China for one year to help promote local education by teaching music there, and the time he spent there had an influence on his music.

Liu never received any systematic training in music, but is self-taught. His classmates recall Liu Huan sitting on the stairs of his dorm, playing his guitar and singing songs until midnight. During his time in France, unlike his classmates who spent their time shopping and sightseeing, he went to bars in search of inspiration.

Singing career
Liu has performed the theme songs for a number of television series. In 1987, he performed his first song, Sun in Heart (心中的太阳), for Snowing City (雪城). He is also well known for performing theme songs to historical television dramas, such as The One Who Wins the Hearts of the People Gains the Empire (得民心者得天下) for 1996 series Yongzheng Dynasty and Heroes' Song (好汉歌), for the 1998 series The Water Margin. His song, Asking Myself a Thousand Times (千萬次的問) remained in the top position for ten weeks on Chinese radio stations.  In 1990, Liu performed the official theme song, Asian Mighty Winds (亚洲雄风), with Wei Wei at the 1990 Asian Games in Beijing.

On 19 March 2004, Liu held the first concert in his 19-year career at the Capital Indoor Stadium, Beijing, called "Huange 2004" (欢歌2004). Other singers included Na Ying, Sun Nan, Sha Baoliang and Warren Mok. In 2006, Liu held his second concert in the Shanghai Indoor Stadium, with fellow singers Na Ying, Sun Nan, Warren Mok and Song Zuying present as guests. On 3 July 2007, Liu, Liao Changyong and Warren Mok held a "Zhenhan" music concert in the Great Hall of the People, Beijing. The singers introduced a blend of popular and classical music in their performance. On 8 August 2008, Liu appeared in front the international audience when he performed the official theme song You and Me with British singer Sarah Brightman at the 2008 Summer Olympics Opening Ceremony in Beijing.
Huan was also featured in the 2008 Beijing Olympics song, Beijing Welcomes You.

In 2012, Liu was asked to act as one of the four judges on The Voice of China, a singing talent show broadcast on Zhejiang TV. The other three judges are Na Ying, Yang Kun and Harlem Yu. Liu returned again in 2017 as a new coach in Sing! China (a rebrand of The Voice of China), and emerged as the winning mentor (his finalist, Tashi Phuntsok 扎西平措, won the season).

In 2019, Liu returned to television to take part in the Hunan TV's long-running singing competition Singer (called I Am a Singer before 2017). On April 12, Liu was crowned the winner of Singer 2019. It was revealed on the final that the song he chose for the final round, which is a three-song medley themed for Empress Xiaoshengxian, was made in tribute to Yao Beina, one of the contestants from the second season of The Voice of China, who died on 16 January 2015, which received a standing ovation from the panel of 500-member judges, and won the season with 62.22% of the votes cast, the highest score attained so far in the history of I Am a Singer.

Teaching career
As well as being a singer-songwriter, Liu is also a teacher. He has taught at the University of International Relations and is currently teaching the history of Western music at the Beijing University of International Business and Economics. "It's a good idea to bring music to more students in China," says Liu.

Despite his pop career in China, Liu is not willing to give up his secondary job, teaching, which he considers to be a stable career. Liu has taught students for ten years, and he is very proud of the fact that he is one of the most popular teachers at the university. “There doesn’t have to be any contradictions between being a singer and a teacher, although they are totally different jobs. I can focus on how to make students have more interest in music when I am in class, after that, I do have time to write songs. I am enjoying being a teacher.” His classes are crowded with other students besides his own students, who come to stand in the classroom to listen to his lectures.

"Liu is perfect for us to carry out the plan because he is such an iconic figure in China's music industry," says David Jin, president and country manager of China and Northeast Asia of Harman.  “I am a teacher so I am close to the students and know their desire for music," Liu Huan says. “Unlike our generation, today's students are active and curious about everything. They are not only interested in established musicians, but also new, alternative music."

Personal life
Liu Huan married Lu Lu, a hostess for Hunan TV, in 1988. Their daughter was born in September 1991. Liu underwent hip replacement surgery at the Beijing University Third Hospital in mid-April 2010. The surgery was very successful.

Liu has a round body, round face, and long braids, the image of Liu Huan is generally unchanging. He prefers to wear black to almost all of his performances. He wore a plain black T-shirt when singing at the 2008 Olympic opening ceremonies. Liu Huan had tried many hairstyles until he first opened in a concert overseas, when his hair was very long and he tied his hair back. From that time onwards, he has kept his hairstyle long, and thinks it is more convenient than other hairstyles.

On December 26, 2018, on the same day Liu was announced as one of the contestants who would take part in Singer 2019, Liu founded "The Liu Huan's Foundation of Original Music" (刘欢原创音乐基金) in collaboration with Mango TV and Mango V, the show's sponsors, where every  (approximately ) of the funding would be extracted every January 11 (the date of the show's premiere episode) of the year to sponsor one potential singer of China. Liu was also the series ambassador and promoting the Mango TV app to encourage viewers across the world to watch the series, as shown before each episode begin airing.

On April 3, 2020, Liu was confirmed to have been diagnosed with Avascular Necrosis, also called osteonecrosis or bone infarction.

Foreign language skills
During Liu Huan’ s lectures, he introduces some foreign words when naming people, schools, and locations. These words are sometimes English, and sometimes French, German, and even Italian. Liu Huan says modestly: “My major is French, and I can speak English, too. With German and Italian, I only know some terms in these languages, but it doesn’t mean I can speak them.”

References

Additional Links
 

1963 births
Living people
Chinese male singer-songwriters
Singers from Tianjin
Yaohua High School alumni
University of International Relations alumni
Academic staff of Beijing University of International Business and Economics